The Grand National is an original classic greyhound racing competition held at Crayford Stadium over the hurdles.
It was run at White City Stadium from 1928 until 1984, it moved to Hall Green Stadium in 1985 and then on to Wimbledon Stadium in 1999.

In 2012, the Greyhound Racing Association allowed the race to leave their portfolio and it switched to Central Park Stadium in Sittingbourne. Central Park held the event until 2022 when it was cancelled in May before Ladbrokes stepped in to sponsor the event which was then held at Crayford for the first time.

Sherrys Prince holds the record of winning the event three times from 1970 to 1972, while trainers Seamus Cahill and Ricky Holloway have both trained four winners.

Past winners

Venues & Distances
1927–1927 (White City, 500 y hurdles)
1928–1974 (White City, 525 y hurdles)
1975–1984 (White City, 500 m hurdles)
1985–1998 (Hall Green, 474 m hurdles)
1999–2009 (Wimbledon, 460 m hurdles)
2010–2011 (Wimbledon, 480 m hurdles)
2012–2022 (Sittingbourne/Central Park, 480 m hurdles)
2022–2023 (Crayford, 380 m hurdles)

Sponsors
2006–2006 (William Hill)
2007–2007 (Betfair)
2008–2009 (Stan James)
2010–2010 (William Hill)
2011–2011 (Primus Saver)
2012–2013 (Cearnsport)
2015–2015 (Chelsea Glass)
2016–2016 (MTS Cleansing Services)
2017–2018 (John Smith's Brewery)
2019–2019 (Cearnsport)
2020–2020 (Colossus Bets)
2021–2021 (RPGTV)
2022–2022 (Arena Racing Company)
2023–2023 (Ladbrokes)

References

Greyhound racing competitions in the United Kingdom
Sport in Sittingbourne
Recurring sporting events established in 1927
Greyhound racing in London
Sports competitions in Birmingham, West Midlands